Aggumi is a village in Kamrup district of Assam, situated on the south bank of the Brahmaputra river, near Chaygaon town.

Transportation
Aggumi is connected to nearby towns through National highway 17.

See also
 Agchia

References

Villages in Kamrup district